Slutka is a rural locality (a village) in Ivano-Kazansky Selsoviet, Iglinsky District, Bashkortostan, Russia. The population was 45 as of 2010. There are 3 streets.

Geography 
Slutka is located 35 km south of Iglino (the district's administrative centre) by road. Monchazy is the nearest rural locality.

References 

Rural localities in Iglinsky District